R579 road may refer to:
 R579 road (Ireland)
 R579 (South Africa)